Khatiban (also Romanized as Khaţībān) is a village in Jirdeh Rural District, in the Central District of Shaft County, Gilan Province, Iran. At the 2006 census, its population was 419, in 108 families.

References 

Populated places in Shaft County